The 2016 All-SEC football team consists of American football players selected to the All-Southeastern Conference (SEC) chosen by the Associated Press (AP) and the conference coaches for the 2016 Southeastern Conference football season.

The Alabama Crimson Tide won the conference, beating the Florida Gators 54 to 16 in the SEC Championship.

Alabama quarterback  Jalen Hurts was voted the AP SEC Offensive Player of the Year. Alabama defensive end Jonathan Allen was voted the AP SEC Defensive Player of the Year.

Offensive selections

Quarterbacks
 Jalen Hurts, Alabama (AP-1, Coaches-1)
 Joshua Dobbs, Tennessee (AP-2, Coaches-2)
Chad Kelly, Ole Miss (AP-2, Coaches-2)

Running backs
Derrius Guice, LSU (AP-1, Coaches-1)
Kamryn Pettway, Auburn (AP-1, Coaches-1)
Rawleigh Williams III, Arkansas (AP-1, Coaches-2)
 Leonard Fournette, LSU (AP-2, Coaches-2)
Ralph Webb, Vanderbilt (AP-2, Coaches-2)

Wide receivers
Christian Kirk, Texas A&M (AP-1, Coaches-1)
Fred Ross, Miss St (AP-1, Coaches-2)
ArDarius Stewart, Alabama (AP-2, Coaches-1)
Calvin Ridley, Alabama (Coaches-2)
Josh Reynolds, Texas A&M (AP-2)
J'Mon Moore, Missouri (AP-2)

Centers
Ethan Pocic, LSU (AP-1, Coaches-1)
Jon Toth, Kentucky (Coaches-2)
Frank Ragnow, Arkansas (AP-2)

Guards
Braden Smith, Auburn (AP-1, Coaches-2)
Alex Kozan, Auburn (AP-1, Coaches-2)
Martez Ivey, Florida (AP-2, Coaches-2)
Will Clapp, LSU (Coaches-1)
Avery Gennesy, Texas A&M  (Coaches-1)
Josh Boutte, LSU (AP-2)
Ross Pierschbacher, Alabama (AP-2)

Tackles
Cam Robinson*, Alabama (AP-1, Coaches-1)
Dan Skipper, Arkansas (AP-1, Coaches-1)
Will Holden, Vanderbilt (Coaches-2)
Robert Leff, Auburn (AP-2)
Jonah Williams, Alabama (AP-2)

Tight ends
Evan Engram*, Ole Miss (AP-1, Coaches-1)
O. J. Howard, Alabama (AP-2, Coaches-2)

Defensive selections

Defensive ends
Jonathan Allen*, Alabama (AP-1, Coaches-1)
Derek Barnett*, Tennessee (AP-1, Coaches-1)
 Myles Garrett, Texas A&M (AP-2, Coaches-1)
Carl Lawson, Auburn (AP-2, Coaches-1)
Arden Key, LSU (AP-1, Coaches-2)
Charles Harris, Missouri (AP-2, Coaches-2)

Defensive tackles 
Montravius Adams, Auburn (AP-1, Coaches-2)
Caleb Brantley, Florida (AP-2, Coaches-2)
Darius English, South Carolina (AP-2)

Linebackers
Zach Cunningham, Vanderbilt (AP-1, Coaches-1)
 Reuben Foster, Alabama (AP-1, Coaches-1)
 Kendell Beckwith, LSU (AP-2, Coaches-1)
Ryan Anderson, Alabama (AP-1)
Tim Williams, Alabama (AP-2, Coaches-2)
Jordan Jones, Kentucky (AP-2, Coaches-2)
Jarrad Davis, Florida (Coaches-2)

Cornerbacks
Teez Tabor, Florida (AP-1, Coaches-1)
Tre'Davious White, LSU (AP-1, Coaches-1)
Minkah Fitzpatrick, Alabama (AP-1, Coaches-1)
Aarion Penton, Missouri (AP-2, Coaches-1)
Quincy Wilson, Florida (AP-2, Coaches-2)

Safeties 
Jamal Adams, LSU (AP-1, Coaches-2)
Justin Evans, Texas A&M (AP-2, Coaches-2)
Eddie Jackson, Alabama (Coaches-2)
Mike Edwards, Kentucky (AP-2)
Marcus Maye, Florida (AP-2)

Special teams

Kickers
Daniel Carlson, Auburn (AP-1, Coaches-1)
Gary Wunderlich, Ole Miss (AP-2, Coaches-2)

Punters
J. K. Scott, Alabama (AP-1, Coaches-1)
Johnny Townsend, Florida (AP-2, Coaches-2)

All purpose/return specialist
Christian Kirk, Texas A&M (AP-1, Coaches-1)
Isaiah McKenzie, Georgia (AP-2)
Derrius Guice, LSU (Coaches-2)
Evan Berry, Tennessee (Coaches-2)

Key

See also
2016 Southeastern Conference football season
2016 College Football All-America Team

References

All-Southeastern Conference
All-SEC football teams